Maurice Sheridan (born 1974) is an Irish former Gaelic footballer. His league and championship career at senior level with the Mayo county team lasted nine seasons from 1995 until 2003.

Playing career
Sheridan made his debut on the inter-county scene when he was picked for the Mayo under-21 team. He won back-to-back Connacht medals in this grade, however, an All-Ireland medal remained elusive. Sheridan made his senior debut during the 1995 championship. He was a regular on the starting fifteen over much of the next decade and won three Connacht medals and one National Football League medal. He was an All-Ireland runner-up on two occasions.

Management
Sheridan oversaw NUI Galway to the final of the 2018 Sigerson Cup. In January 2021, Sheridan was appointed manager of the Mayo under-20 county team.

Personal life
Sheridan teaches at Coláiste Bhaile Chláir in Claregalway.

Career statistics

Honours
 Salthill-Knocknacarra
 All-Ireland Senior Club Football Championship (1): 2006
 Connacht Senior Club Football Championship (1): 2005
 Galway Senior Club Football Championship (1): 2005

 Mayo
 Connacht Senior Football Championship (1): 1996, 1997, 1999
National Football League (1): 2000-01

References

1974 births
Living people
Balla Gaelic footballers
Coaches of Gaelic football teams at Irish universities
Gaelic football managers
Irish schoolteachers
Mayo inter-county Gaelic footballers
Salthill-Knocknacarra Gaelic footballers